Dimitar Blagoev Nikolov (14 June 1856 – 7 May 1924) was a Bulgarian political leader and philosopher. He was the founder of the Bulgarian left-wing political movement and of the first social-democratic party in the Balkans, the Marxist Bulgarian Social Democratic Party. Blagoev was also an important figure in the early history of Russian Marxism, and later founded and led the Bulgarian Communist Party. He was a prominent proponent of ideas for the establishment of a Balkan Federation. He is usually regarded and self-identified as a Bulgarian, and occasionally as a Macedonian Slav.

Biography

Early years and education
Blagoev was born in the village of Zagorichani in the region of Macedonia (today Vasiliada in Agioi Anargyroi, Kastoria, Greece), at that time part of the Ottoman Empire. In his youth he was influenced by the atmosphere of the Bulgarian National Revival. In his memoirs written in 1922, Blagoev mentions that he was born in a pure Bulgarian village, receiving his national idea by Bulgarian agitators and as a result he was educated in nationalist spirit. He learned consequently in Bulgarian Exarchate's schools in Istanbul (1873–1874), Adrianople (1874–1875), Gabrovo (1875–1876) and Stara Zagora (1876–1877). As a student in Gabrovo he supported the cause of the April uprising, and participated on its preparation. During the Russo-Turkish War, he supported the activity of the opalchentsi and the Russian Army. Later he studied at the Odessa Realschule from 1878 to 1880. 

In autumn 1880, Blagoev enrolled in Saint Petersburg University. In the Russian capital, he was originally influenced by the populist ideas of Lavrov those of the French anarchist Proudhon. But by the autumn of 1883, reading the first volume of Das Kapital, by Karl Marx, and works by the German socialist Lassalle, and pamphlet Socialism and the Political Struggle written by the exiled Russian Marxist Georgi Plekhanov had converted him to Marxism. In 1884, he formed the first Marxist group to operate within Russia, which was known as the Blagoev Group. In 1885, the group produced a newspaper, "Rabochii" (Worker), Russia's first Marxist publication. Also in 1885, it aligned with Plekhanov's Emancipation of Labour Group, based in Switzerland. 

In 1883, Blagoev met and married the teacher, writer, and women's activist Vela Blagoeva (née Victoria Atanasova Zhivkova) with whom he would have four children: Stela, Natalia, Vladimir and Dimitur.

Return to Bulgaria

Blagoev was arrested on 1 March 1885, and extradited to Bulgaria, settled in Sofia and began to propagate socialist ideas. In July 1891, on his initiative, the social democratic circles of Veliko Tarnovo, Gabrovo, Sliven, Stara Zagora, Kazanlak and other cities united to form the Bulgarian Social Democratic Party (BSDP). The marxist nucleus of the BSDP was opposed by a group, who were essentially opposed to making the social democratic movement into a party. In 1893 this group, led by Yanko Sakazov, founded a reformist organization, the Bulgarian Social Democratic Union. In 1894, Blagoev’s supporters agreed to unite with the Unionists in the interests of working class unity and took the name Bulgarian Social Democratic Workers Party. He was a founder and became the leader of its left wing, which split from the BSDWP in 1903 to found the Bulgarian Social Democratic Workers' Party (Narrow Socialists). Blagoev was also activist of the Plovdiv Macedonian-Adrianople Committee, and its chairman from 1897. In 1898 Gotse Delchev made attempt to convince him to lead the Supreme Macedonian-Adrianople Committee, but he refused. Under his guidance the foundations of the class trade-union movement was laid in 1904. From 1897 to 1923 Blagoev directed the publication of the party’s theoretical organ, the journal "Novo vreme", which published more than 500 of his articles. Meanwhile, he worked as teacher in different cities in Bulgaria. In 1905, Blagoev translated into Bulgarian the first volume of Das Kapital and a number of other works by Marx. Blagoev’s book "From the History of Socialism in Bulgaria" was published in 1906 and it has initiated Bulgarian Marxist historiography. He led the delegations of narrow socialists at the Balkan socialist conferences in Belgrade (1910) and Bucharest (1915).

Wartime activities and stance

He was against foreign intervention by the Great Powers in Southeast Europe, believed in a Balkan Federative Republic and opposed Bulgaria's military engagements in the Second Balkan War and First World War. A deputy to the National Assembly of Bulgaria, Blagoev voted in October 1914, along with the rest of the faction of narrow socialists, against war credits. During World War I as deputy Blagoev exposed "the war’s imperialist nature and the traitorous role of the Second International". Blagoev hailed the Russian October Revolution and propagandized for the ideas of the Bolsheviks. Under his leadership the Narrow Socialist party broke with the Second International. In a speech before the Bulgarian National Assembly in 1917, Blagoev called himself "Macedonian Slav". In a Declaration against the Treaty of Neuilly, read by Dimiter Blagoev in the Bulgarian National Assembly in 1919 he protested against the partition of the Bulgarian land and nation and promoted the ideas of the Bulgarian Soviet Socialist Republic, as a part of a Balkan Federal Soviet Socialist Republic, as the only political solution able to assure freedom of Macedonia, Thrace and Dobruja and as a counterweight of Bulgarian nationalism.

Later years and death

Blagoev led the Narrow Socialists into the Communist International in 1919, and the party changed its name to the Bulgarian Communist Party. However, during this period Blagoev and the party as a whole did not completely adopt Bolshevik positions on the basic questions. This determined the party’s policies during the Vladaya Soldiers’ Rebellion of 1918 and the military coup of 9 June 1923 when the party adopted a position of neutrality. He was also an opponent of the failed September Uprising, believing that conditions were not ripe for a revolution in Bulgaria at that time.

Blagoev was also author of a number of research essays on questions of Marxist philosophy, political economy, history, esthetics, and Bulgarian literature. He died in Sofia, Bulgaria.

Honours
 The city of Gorna Dzhumaya in today's Blagoevgrad Province in Bulgaria was renamed after him, Blagoevgrad.
 The village of Blahoyeve in Odessa Oblast was renamed in 1923 after him (formerly Velikiy Buyalyk).
 The settlement of Blagoyevo in the Komi Republic of Russia also bears Dimitar Blagoev's name.
 The Buzludzha Monument on the peak of Buzludzha was built by the Bulgarian communist regime to commemorate the 1891 founding of the Bulgarian Social Democratic Party. It was opened in 1981.

Gallery

Notes

External links
 Dimitûr Blagoev, On the Macedonian Question, June 1905, in Andreja Živković and Dragan Plavšić (eds), "The Balkan Socialist Tradition and the Balkan Federation 1871-1915", "Revolutionary History", London, 2003.
 Dimitûr Blagoev, The Revolution in Turkey and Social Democracy, 1908.
 Dimitûr Blagoev, Political Prospects, June 1909.
 Dimitûr Blagoev, The Balkan Conference and the Balkan Federation, December 1911.

1856 births
1924 deaths
Bulgarians from Aegean Macedonia
Bulgarian Workers' Social Democratic Party politicians
Bulgarian Communist Party politicians
Modern history of the Blagoevgrad Province
Macedonia under the Ottoman Empire
People extradited from Russia
People extradited to Bulgaria
Macedonian Bulgarians
Members of the National Assembly (Bulgaria)
People from Kastoria (regional unit)
Bulgarian Marxists